Ancistrus agostinhoi is a species of catfish in the family Loricariidae. It is native to South America, where it occurs in the Iguazu River basin in the state of Paraná in Brazil. The species reaches 9.6 cm (3.8 inches) SL. It was described in 2009 by A. G. Bifi, C. S. Pavanelli, and C. H. Zawadzki, alongside two other species in the genus Ancistrus: A. abilhoai and A. mullerae.

References 

agostinhoi
Fish described in 2009
Freshwater fish of Brazil